The 1994 Canada rugby union tour of England and France was a series of matches played in December 1994 in England and France by the Canada national rugby union team to prepare for the 1995 Rugby World Cup.

Results
'Scores and results list Canada's points tally first.

References

Canada
Canada national rugby union team tours
tour
tour
tour
Rugby union tours of England
Rugby union tours of France